Chester Allan Browne (20 July 1888 – 12 October 1941) was a Barbadian cricketer who played first-class cricket for Barbados from 1907 to 1929. He represented West Indies in the days before West Indies played Test cricket.

A batsman and occasional bowler, Browne played for West Indies against the touring English teams of 1910-11 and 1912-13. His only first-class century came when Barbados beat British Guiana in 1926–27, when he scored 131 not out, adding 216 for the eighth wicket with Barto Bartlett.

References

External links
 
 Allan Browne at CricketArchive

1888 births
1941 deaths
Barbadian cricketers
Barbados cricketers
Pre-1928 West Indies cricketers
People from Saint Michael, Barbados